Araguacema is a municipality located in the Brazilian state of Tocantins. Its population was 7,155 (2020) and its area is 2,778 km².

The municipality contains 17.15% of the  Ilha do Bananal / Cantão Environmental Protection Area, created in 1997.

References

Municipalities in Tocantins